The Road To Memphis is a documentary directed by Richard Pearce. The film is part of The Blues, a seven part PBS series, with Martin Scorsese as the executive producer.

Synopsis 
The Road To Memphis follows the career of Blues musician B.B. King as he returns to his hometown where he got his start at WDIA radio station. It features interviews and performances by B.B. King, Bobby Rush, Rosco Gordon and Ike Turner as they come together in Memphis for the W. C. Handy awards in 2002. The film also contains historical footage of Howlin' Wolf and Rufus Thomas.

Critical reception 
Variety (September 6, 2003): Road to Memphis" is about the blues in the here and now — historical footage is kept to a minimum — and it establishes the notion that this remains a hard life for anyone who chooses it...Pic’s cornerstone is a reunion show of the four Memphis artists, and Pearce introduces them in a hierarchical scale: King is a passenger in his well-appointed bus; Rush is his own bus driver. Everyone seems to know Ike Turner, whose musical reputation keeps doors open; Gordon pleads for recognition.

References

External links 
PBS website for The Road to Memphis

Documentary films about blues music and musicians
PBS original programming
B.B. King
Ike Turner
Coretta Scott King Award-winning works